Kōdo Station may refer to two different train stations in Japan:
,  on the Kintetsu Kyoto Line in Kyōtanabe, Kyoto, Japan, opened 1954
, a former train station on the Kabe Line in Asakita-ku, Hiroshima, Japan, operated 1956–2003